Three steamships of the Castle Line or Union-Castle Line carried the name Braemar Castle.

, in service 1898–1924
, in service 1949–50
, in service 1952–66

Ship names